Gualta is a village in the province of Girona and autonomous community of Catalonia, Spain.

The GR 92 long distance footpath, which roughly follows the length of the Mediterranean coast of Spain, passes through the village. Gualta lies on an inland stage of the path, between Torroella de Montgrí and Begur. To the north the path heads directly towards Torroella across the Ter river, and to the south it passes through Fontanilles.

References

External links
 Government data pages 

Municipalities in Baix Empordà
Populated places in Baix Empordà